Ibn Farḥūn al-Mālikīfull name; Ibrāhīm b. ‘Alī b. M. Ibn Farḥūn, Burhān al-Dīn al-Ya’marī al-Andalusī al-Mālikī (ca.1358 - 1397) was an Arab Mālikī faqīh (jurist) of Medina. born into a prominent Arab family that traced its descent to Quraysh. He traveled to Egypt, Levant (Syria) and Jerusalem.  In 1390 he returned to Medina, where he professed adherence to Maliki Islam and became qāḍa (judge). His principal biographer, Aḥmad Bābā attributes eight books to him.  Only two MSS have been published, while three are lost.

Works
Al-dībāj al-mudhhab fī ma‘rifat a‘yān ‘ulamā’ al-madhhab; popularly known as Al-Dībāj, a biographical dictionary of Mālikī ‘ulamā’ (scholars) and comprehensive history of Malikite thought and scholarship of the school in Al-Andalus and the Maghreb, its rites, biography of its founder Mālik ibn Anas and bibliography. Supplements and abridgements include Nayl al-ibtihāj the edition with Aḥmad Bābā (Cairo, 1351/1932). 
Tabṣirat al-ḥukkām fī uṣūl al-aqḍiya wa-manāhij al-aḥkām; manual of legal procedures, rules of evidence, etc.
Durrat al-ghawwāṣ fī muḥāḍarat al-khawāṣṣ ('the pearl-diver's prize on the discourse of elites'); treatise on legal riddles.
Kashf al-niqāb al-ḥājib 'an muṣṭalaḥ Ibn al-Ḥājib;
Irshād al-sālik ilá afʻāl al-manāsik;

Bibliography

External links
Kutub al-Khisal wa-l'Alghaz wa-l-Mustalahat_almarkaz.ma (in Arabic)

See also
List of Arab scientists and scholars
Encyclopædia Britannica Online

References

1358 births
1397 deaths
14th-century biographers
14th-century jurists
14th-century writers
Arab biographers
Maliki fiqh scholars
Encyclopedists of the medieval Islamic world
People from Medina
14th-century Arabic writers
14th-century historians of the medieval Islamic world